Gregg Township is the name of some places in the U.S. state of Pennsylvania:

Gregg Township, Centre County, Pennsylvania
Gregg Township, Union County, Pennsylvania

See also
 Gregg Township, Morgan County, Indiana

Pennsylvania township disambiguation pages